Alexander Robert McLean  (born 18 October 1950) is a former New Zealand rower who won an Olympic bronze medal.

Early life and family
Born in Wellington, New Zealand, on 18 October 1950, McLean was educated at Onslow College. In 1975, he married Denise Holmwood, and the couple had three children. He remarried Dinah Jane Okeby in 1990, and they had at least two more children.

Rowing career
At the 1976 Summer Olympics in Montreal he crewed the eight along with Tony Hurt, Ivan Sutherland, Trevor Coker, Peter Dignan, Lindsay Wilson, Joe Earl and Dave Rodger and Simon Dickie (cox).

He was a member of New Zealand rowing eight between 1974 and 1976. He won a bronze medal at the 1974 World Rowing Championships in Lucerne, Switzerland. He was again a bronze medallist at the 1975 World Rowing Championships in Nottingham, England.

Career as a public servant
McLean worked for the New Zealand Customs Department from 1968 until 1978, before becoming a parliamentary private secretary. Until 2008 he served two prime ministers, Robert Muldoon (1979–1981) and Helen Clark (1999 - 2008), and ministers including Ministers of Customs Peter Wilkinson (1978) and Hugh Templeton (1979), Ministers of Social Welfare Venn Young (1984), Ann Hercus (1984–1987), and Michael Cullen (1989), Minister of Finance Roger Douglas (1984–1987), Minister of Health Helen Clark (1990), and deputy prime minister Don McKinnon (1990–1993). McLean then served as deputy official secretary to the Governor-General of New Zealand from 2009 to 2012. From March 2012 McLean returned to parliament as private secretary to David Shearer, Leader of the Opposition.

From October 2014 to May 2015, McLean worked as property manager at Caniwi Capital Partners, in Wellington.

After Shearer's departure from Parliament in December 2016 to take up a position with the United Nations, McLean became executive assistant to the new Mt Roskill MP, Michael Wood, Revenue spokesperson for the Labour opposition. In October 2017, Mclean took up the interim position as senior private secretary to Grant Robertson, Minister of Finance in the new Labour-led Government. McLean retired in December 2017.

Honours and awards
McLean was appointed a Companion of the Queen's Service Order for public services in the New Zealand 2010 New Year Honours. He was also awarded the New Zealand 1990 Commemoration Medal.

References

External links 
 
 

1950 births
New Zealand male rowers
Olympic rowers of New Zealand
Olympic bronze medalists for New Zealand
Rowers at the 1976 Summer Olympics
Living people
Olympic medalists in rowing
Companions of the Queen's Service Order
World Rowing Championships medalists for New Zealand
Medalists at the 1976 Summer Olympics